Shadrach Morgan, sometimes written Shadrack Morgan, was a member of the South Carolina House of Representatives during the Reconstruction era. His grandson had the same name graduated from Howard University and became a Civil Rights lawyer in South Carolina. The younger Shadrach also studied at South Carolina State University and helped register African Americans for selective service during World War II.

References

Members of the South Carolina House of Representatives
Year of birth missing (living people)
Living people